"A Job to Do" is a song by American rock musician Jerry Cantrell, written for the end credits of the 2017 film John Wick: Chapter 2. The song premiered on Billboard's website on February 9, 2017, and was featured on John Wick: Chapter 2 (Original Motion Picture Soundtrack) as the last track on the album. A lyric video featuring Cantrell and Keanu Reeves was released on YouTube on March 21, 2017. 

"A Job to Do" marks the first time Cantrell released a solo song since 2002. The song was first played live on December 6, 2019, at Cantrell's solo concert at the Pico Union Project in Los Angeles.

Origin and recording
The song was recorded at Igloo Music Studios in Burbank, California between November 8, 2015 and January 21, 2016.

Jerry Cantrell wrote the lyrics from the perspective of Keanu Reeves' title character in John Wick: Chapter 2. Cantrell told Billboard about the song:

Release
"A Job to Do" premiered on Billboard's website on February 9, 2017, a day before the soundtrack was released.

A lyric video featuring Jerry Cantrell and Keanu Reeves was released on YouTube on March 21, 2017.

Live performances
The song was performed live for the first time during Jerry Cantrell's solo concert at the Pico Union Project in Los Angeles on December 6, 2019. Cantrell was accompanied by Tyler Bates on guitar and Gil Sharone on drums, both musicians who performed in the original recording.

Personnel
 Jerry Cantrell – vocals, acoustic and electric guitar
 Tyler Bates – bass
 Gil Sharone – drums

Production
Produced by Jerry Cantrell, Tyler Bates
Engineered by Paul Figueroa
Published by Boggy Bottom Publishing

References

External links

2017 songs
Jerry Cantrell songs
Songs written by Jerry Cantrell
Songs written by Tyler Bates
Songs written for films
John Wick